Bolero is a 1984 American romantic drama film written and directed by John Derek and starring Bo Derek. The film centers on the protagonist's sexual awakening and her journey around the world to pursue an ideal first lover who will take her virginity.

A box office flop, the film was critically panned, earning nominations for nine Golden Raspberry Awards at the 5th Golden Raspberry Awards and "winning" six, including the Worst Picture. It won the CVF Awards for "Worst Picture" (Golan-Globus), "Worst Actress" (Bo Derek), "Worst Actor" (George Kennedy), "Worst Supporting Actor" (Andrea Occhipinti), "Worst Director" (John Derek), "Worst Screenplay" (John Derek)", and "Worst Musical Score" (Peter and Elmer Bernstein).

Plot
Set in the 1920s, Ayre "Mac" MacGillvary is a virginal 23-year-old young American who graduates from an exclusive British college. An orphan heiress to a vast fortune, Ayre is determined to find the right man for her first sexual encounter wherever he might be in the world. Rich enough not to venture forth alone, she brings along her best friend Catalina and the family chauffeur Cotton.

Ayre first travels to Morocco where she meets an ideal lover, an Arab sheik who offers to deflower her. He takes her away in his private airplane to an oasis in the desert, but during foreplay, while rubbing her nude body with honey, he falls asleep almost immediately. Giving up on the sheik, Ayre goes on to Spain, where she meets the toreador Angel, and sets out to seduce him. Into this group comes Paloma, a 14-year-old local Gypsy girl whom Ayre and Catalina take under their wing. A minor subplot involves Catalina meeting and pursuing Ayre's lawyer, Robert Stewart, a kilt-wearing Scotsman whom Catalina chooses to deflower her.

After several days of courtship and flirting, Angel makes love to Ayre one morning and he manages to stay awake. Unfortunately, after Ayre has succeeded in her quest to lose her virginity, Angel is gored while bullfighting the next day.

The injury leaves Angel unable to perform in the bedroom, and so Ayre makes it her mission in life to see to his recovery. Along the way, she takes up bullfighting herself as a way of getting her despondent lover motivated to stop moping. During this, the Arab sheik flies to Spain to abduct Ayre, but she manages to convince him that she has already lost her virginity and he lets her go.

Eventually, Ayre is successful in aiding Angel to full recovery which leads to a climactic lovemaking session between them. Finally, Ayre and Angel get married at a local church.

Cast
 Bo Derek as Ayre “Mac” McGillvary
 George Kennedy as Cotton
 Andrea Occhipinti as Rejoneador Angel Sacristan
 Ana Obregon as Catalina
 Olivia d'Abo as Paloma
 Greg Bensen as Sheik
 Ian Cochrane as Robert Stewart
 Mirta Miller as Evita
 Mickey Knox as Sleazy Moroccan guide
 Paul Stacey as Young Valentino #1
 James Stacey as Young Valentino #2

Production and release

Executive producer and Cannon Films co-head Menahem Golan urged the Dereks to make the sex scenes more explicit, despite the pair's objections that the scenes were strong enough. The film was to be distributed by MGM as part of an ongoing deal with Cannon, and Bo Derek screened the film for MGM's then-CEO Frank Yablans, hoping that he would intervene with Golan on the matter of the erotic content. Yablans disliked the film as much as all the other films Cannon was delivering to MGM.

When the producers refused to cut the film to avoid an X rating by the MPAA, MGM dropped the film due to standards policies and Cannon released Bolero themselves. The quality of Bolero and the other Cannon/MGM films led to Yablans using a breach of contract clause to terminate the distribution deal with Cannon in November 1984. Bolero was ultimately released with no MPAA rating, with a disclaimer on ads that no children under 17 would be admitted to the film. Despite this, many theater chains that normally refused to screen X-rated films did the same for Bolero.

The film is officially on DVD with an "R" rating with no cuts.

Olivia d'Abo, who had a nude scene, was 14 during filming. "I matured physically at 13. When I did Bolero with Bo and John Derek, John thought I had implants. But I know I look young and innocent, which helps me get roles," she said.

Reception

Box office 
The film earned about $8.9 million in American ticket sales against a $7 million production budget.

Critical response 
The review aggregator website Rotten Tomatoes reports an approval rating of 0% based on 23 reviews and an average rating of 1.43/10. The website's consensus reads, "Bolero combines a ludicrous storyline and wildly mismatched cast in its desperate attempts to titillate, but only succeeds in arousing boredom". Metacritic reports a score of 13/100 based on nine critics, indicating "overwhelming dislike". 
Audiences polled by CinemaScore gave Bolero a rare grade of "F" on an A+ to F scale, making it the first of only 22 films that are known to have received this grade.

Roger Ebert of the Chicago Sun-Times gave the film 0.5 out of 4 stars, writing: "The real future of Bolero is in home cassette rentals, where your fast forward and instant replay controls will supply the editing job the movie so desperately needs". David Robinson of The Times said that the story was "the authentic stuff of mild pornography", and wrote that the film's climax "No doubt ... distracted the writer-director from the dialogue, which is in every sense unspeakable." David Richards of The Washington Post wrote: "Bad as Bolero is, it is unfortunately not bad enough. Seekers of inadvertent high-camp hilarity will be as let down as those who are suckered in by the promise of Bo's golden flesh". Janet Maslin of The New York Times wrote that the plot "sounds like that of a straight porn film, which is what Bolero would have become with anyone other than John Derek directing", and criticized the dialogue as "tending to sound like very bad pulp romance". David Sterritt of The Christian Science Monitor wrote: "This tedious romance ... is a strong candidate for worst picture of the year".

It was nominated for nine Golden Raspberry Awards and won six, including "Worst Picture", "Worst Actress," "Worst Director", and "Worst Screenplay". In 1990, the film was nominated for the Razzie Award for "Worst Picture of the Decade", but lost to Mommie Dearest. Also in 1984, the film was nominated for a Stinkers Bad Movie Awards for Worst Picture.

Home media
In 1985, U.S.A. Home Video released Bolero in both Unrated and R-Rated versions to the video rental marketplace. In 2005, MGM Home Entertainment released Bolero on DVD, after the rights to the majority of Cannon Film productions reverted to MGM.

References

External links

 
 
 

 

1984 films
1984 romantic drama films
American independent films
American romantic drama films
American sexploitation films
1980s English-language films
American erotic romance films
Films scored by Elmer Bernstein
Films about virginity
Films directed by John Derek
Films set in the 1920s
Films shot in England
Films shot in Morocco
Films shot in Spain
Bullfighting films
Golan-Globus films
Films with screenplays by John Derek
1984 independent films
Golden Raspberry Award winning films
1980s American films